Sporting Clube da Brava is a Capeverdean football (soccer) club based in Nova Sintra and serves the island of Brava along with its surrounding uninhabited islets of the north. The club was founded in 1988. Sporting currently play in the Brava Island League, their last national championship participation was in the 2017 Cape Verdean Football Championships.  Sporting Brava has never been lower than the second tier.
This list encompasses the records set by the club and its statistics.

The club currently is third for the most Brava titles with four behind SC Morabeza and Nô Pintcha.

All stats accurate as of the end of the 2018 regional regular season

Records and statistics

Best position: 2nd - Group Stage (national)
Best position at cup competitions: 1st (regional)
Best position at an opening tournament: 1st
Appearances at the championships:
National: 4
Regional: 22
Appearance at a regional cup competition: 5
Appearances at regional super cup competition: 3
Total matches played: 21 (national)
Total matches played at home: 9
Total matches played away: 12
Total points: 19 (national)
Total wins: 5 (national)
Total wins at home: 3
Total wins away: 2
Total draws: 4 (national)
Total draws at home: 3
Total draws away: 1
Total goals scored: 20 (national)
Best season:
National: 2017 (3 wins, 1 draw, 6 goals, 10 pts)
Regional: 2017 (12 wins, 0 draws, 0 losses)
Highest number of goals scored in a season:
National: 6, in 2016 and in 2017
Regional: 67, in 2017
Highest number of points in a season:
National: 10, in 2017
Regional: 36, in 2017
Highest number of wins in a season:
National 3, in 2017
Regional: 12 in 2015 and in 2017
Longest unbeaten run at the regional championships: 53 matches (April 14, 2013 – February 23, 2018)
Longest unbeaten run at home: 29 matches (since February 17, 2013)
Longest unbeaten run away: 23 matches (April 14, 2013 – February 23, 2018)
Highest scoring match(es):
National: 2 with three goals
FC Ultramarina 4-3 Sporting Brava, 4 June 2015
Sinagoga 2-3 Sporting Brava, 15 May 2016
Regional: Corôa 2-16 Sporting Brava, 30 April 2017

Other:
Appearance at the São Filipe Municipal Tournament: Once, in 2016

Lowest number of goals scored in a season: 3 (national), in 2015
Lowest number of points in a season: 1 (national), in 2015
Highest number of goals conceded in a season: 16 (national), 2015
Highest number of matches lost in a season: 4 (national), 2015
Total losses: 12 (national)
Total goals conceded: 41 (national)
Worst defeat at the National Championships: Mindelense 6-0 Sporting Brava, May 23, 2015

National championship record by opponent
Sporting Brava's first team has competed in a number of regionally and nationally contested leagues, and its national tier record against each club faced in these competitions is listed below. The team that Sporting Brava has met most in national championships competition is Derby from Mindelo whom they have contested 4 matches each after the end of the 2017 regular season.

Derby and Sporting Praia have also defeated Sporting Brava in league competition on two occasions each, which represents the most Sporting Brava have lost against any club. Sporting Brava have won two of the matches against Sal Rei, which represents the most Sporting Brava have won against any club.

Key
  Teams with this background and symbol in the "Club" column are (and were for some clubs who are out of the playoffs) competing in the 2017 National Championships alongside Sporting Brava
P = matches played; W = matches won; D = matches drawn; L = matches lost; F = Goals scored; A = Goals conceded; Win% = percentage of total matches won

All-time championship record
Statistics correct as of the end of the 2017 regular season

References

Cape Verdean football club statistics
Sporting Clube da Brava